Mohd Zakry bin Abdul Latif (born 2 April 1983) is a former Malaysian badminton player.

Career

2007
Mohd Zakry played at the 2007 BWF World Championships in men's doubles with Mohd Fairuzizuan Mohd Tazari. They were seeded #7 and were defeated in the second round by Guo Zhendong and Xie Zhongbo, of China, 21-14, 21-13.

At the 2007 China Open Super Series they beat the tournament number two seeded, Cai Yun and Fu Haifeng in three sets in the first round. However, in the same round of the next Super Series, the Hong Kong Super Series, Mohd Fairuzizuan and Mohd Zakry were forced to bid an early farewell by the same rivals.

2010 
Mohd Zakry Abdul Latif-Hoon Thien How also sparked off a great hope after taking a 26-24 opening game win against All-England champions Paaske-Rasmussen before going down 12-21, 19-21 in a 74-minute battle.

Achievements

World Championships 
Men's doubles

Asian Championships 
Men's doubles

Southeast Asian Games 
Men's doubles

IBF World Grand Prix/BWF Super Series/BWF Grand Prix Gold 
Men's doubles

  BWF Superseries tournament
 Grand Prix Gold Tournament

References

External links
 
 
 Profile at Badminton Association of Malaysia

1983 births
Living people
People from Negeri Sembilan
Malaysian male badminton players
Malaysian people of Malay descent
Badminton players at the 2002 Asian Games
Asian Games bronze medalists for Malaysia
Asian Games medalists in badminton
Medalists at the 2002 Asian Games
Competitors at the 2009 Southeast Asian Games
Southeast Asian Games silver medalists for Malaysia
Southeast Asian Games bronze medalists for Malaysia
Southeast Asian Games medalists in badminton